Pobuzhany is a village (selo), which is located in Zolochiv Raion, Lviv Oblast of Western Ukraine. It belongs to Busk urban hromada, one of the hromadas of Ukraine. Pobuzhany is a small village, which has an area of 4.4 km2. The population of the village is about 1040 people  and Local government is administered by Pobuzhanska village council.

Geography 

History 
The first written records mention the village 1433.

Until 18 July 2020, Pobuzhany belonged to Busk Raion. The raion was abolished in July 2020 as part of the administrative reform of Ukraine, which reduced the number of raions of Lviv Oblast to seven. The area of Busk Raion was merged into Zolochiv Raion.

Cult constructions and religion 
The village has active Church of Christ's Resurrection (stone, 2002) and wooden church and bell tower of Church the Ascension of the Lord (1777) preserved in the village. This is a wooden church, an architectural monument of local importance.

References

External links 
 Pobuzhanska village council
 Побужани/Церква Вознесіння Господнього 1777 
 weather.in.ua/Pobuzhany (Lviv region)
 Церква Воскресіння Господнього с. Побужани і дзвіниця/Охоронний №438/1-2 XVIII 

Villages in Zolochiv Raion, Lviv Oblast